Rache Bartmoss' Guide to the Net is a 1993 role-playing game supplement published by R. Talsorian Games for Cyberpunk.

Contents
Rache Bartmoss' Guide to the Net is a general overview, background, and names, places and secrets found by hacker Rache Bartmoss.

Reception
Steve Jackson reviewed Rache Bartmoss' Guide to the Net in Pyramid #6 (March, 1994), and stated that "If you're doing netrunning in a dark-future world, with the Cyberpunk 2020 rules or any other, get this book. Especially at the price. Forgive them their four-color sins and their bad proofreading... this time... and enjoy Rache."

Reviews
Rollespilsmagasinet Fønix (Danish) (Issue 1 - March/April 1994)

References

Cyberpunk (role-playing game) supplements
Role-playing game supplements introduced in 1993